Helen Lucas D.Litt. (born 1931) is a Canadian artist born in Weyburn, Saskatchewan, whose work features Greek Orthodox icons, female sexuality, and flowers. Her career as an artist spans over five decades.

Early life 
Lucas was raised in Saskatoon, the eldest daughter of parents who had emigrated from Greece. When she was six weeks old her family moved to Saskatchewan to operate the Ritz Hotel. She was never encouraged by her family to do art as they were preoccupied with establishing a new life and a good living in Saskatchewan.  The impact of traditional religious observance on her day-to-day life resulted in good manners. After high school Lucas studied pre-medicine for a year before moving to Toronto to study at the Ontario College of Art, where she began to paint. Her parents encouraged this, financially supporting her through college. Though her first show received some positive reviews, she says she was advised by the Greek Church to reduce her artistic endeavours in order to make time for her first love, her devotion to religious studies.

Career 

Lucas taught at Sheridan College in Oakville, Ontario, as Drawing and Painting Master from 1973 to 1979. While there, she produced a series of political black and white pieces and worked alongside Shelagh Wilkinson, co-founder of Canadian Woman Studies.

Lucas' work is best known for large canvases devoted to colourful flowers, but earlier sketches and paintings explored icons of the Greek Orthodox Church, the Virgin Mary, and female sexuality. The dark nature reflected in Lucas' work during this period has been linked to her deep religious faith, the turmoil of learning to live away from her family in Saskatoon, her guilt at her parents’ financial sacrifice for her education, and the unhappiness she experienced during her 20-year marriage to her first husband. Lucas explains that during this period she "had no feeling for colour." The thematic transition of Lucas' work was chronicled in a film by Donna Davey, Helen Lucas: Her Journey -- Our Journey, which won the Gold Plaque for Best Documentary at the Chicago International Film Festival. The film included an interview with her friend, Margaret Laurence. Lucas's drawings were included in Laurence's book, A Christmas Birthday Story (New York and Toronto, 1980). Laurence described Lucas' contributions as "joyous, beautiful and wise."

In addition to delivering lectures on women in the arts, Lucas appeared on radio and television from the 1970s to the 1990s. She has exhibited her art in Canada, the United States, Europe, Africa and Japan. Several works were acquired by public collections in Canada and by private international collections. Lucas has published drawings and text in several newspapers, magazines, and journals, and she has been an active participant in Canadian women studies projects. Nearing ninety, she no longer paints and instead spends her time thinking of her late parents who put her through art school. She lives in King Township, Ontario where she lived with her second husband, Derek Fuller, until his death in 1996.

Awards and Distinctions 
In 2012 she was awarded the Queen Elizabeth II Diamond Jubilee Medal, as well as having been awarded an Honorary Doctor of Letters by York University in 1991.

Publications
Lucas authored  As well as

Notes

External links 
Helen Lucas artwork given to York University, 1998
Helen Lucas archives are held at the Clara Thomas Archives and Special Collections, York University Libraries, Toronto, Ontario

1931 births
Living people
Canadian women painters
Canadian people of Greek descent
Artists from Saskatchewan
OCAD University alumni
People from Weyburn
Academic staff of Sheridan College
21st-century Canadian women artists